Riley Nottingham (born 1991) is an Australian actor. He is known for his work in the children's TV series Toybox and the film Dimensions. He currently portrays Dr Langdon Marsh in Metro Sexual alongside Geraldine Hickey. He has appeared on The Weekly with Charlie Pickering, Tomorrow Tonight and The Gods of Wheat Street.

Filmography

References

External links

Australian male film actors
Australian male television actors
Living people
1991 births
21st-century Australian male actors